Roberto Feliciano Bolonti (born March 2, 1984) is an Argentine professional boxer.

Professional career
On 17 November 2012, Bolonti was beat by Tony Bellew for the WBC silver title. Bellew was cut badly but went the full 12 rounds to a win unanimous decision.

June 7, 2014 on a fight for the WBA light heavyweight title, Bolonti lost in a Unanimous Decision against Juergen Braehmer.

December 6, 2014 his fight against Jean Pascal ended in no contest after Canadian's unintentional foul.

On 19 August 2015, Roberto will face Danny Green on his comeback after almost 3 years outside the ring.

Professional boxing record

| style="text-align:center;" colspan="8"|39 wins (26 knockouts), 6 losses, 0 draws
|-  style="text-align:center; background:#e3e3e3;"
|  style="border-style:none none solid solid; "|Res.
|  style="border-style:none none solid solid; "|Record
|  style="border-style:none none solid solid; "|Opponent
|  style="border-style:none none solid solid; "|Type
|  style="border-style:none none solid solid; "|Rd., Time
|  style="border-style:none none solid solid; "|Date
|  style="border-style:none none solid solid; "|Location
|  style="border-style:none none solid solid; "|Notes
|- align=center
|Win
|39-6
|align=left| Dario Balmaceda
|
|
|
|align=left|
|align=left|
|- align=center
|Win
|38-6
|align=left| Dario Balmaceda
|
|
|
|align=left|
|align=left|
|- align=center
|Loss
|37-6
|align=left| Kevin Lerena
|
|
|
|align=left|
|align=left|
|- align=center
|Win
|37-5
|align=left| Walter David Cabral
|
|
|
|align=left|
|align=left|
|- align=center
|Loss
|36-5
|align=left| Youri Kayembre Kalenga
|
|
|
|align=left|
|align=left|
|- align=center
|Loss
|36-4
|align=left| Danny Green
|
|
|
|align=left|
|align=left|
|- align=center
|Win
|36-3
|align=left| Williams Ocando
|
|
|
|align=left|
|align=left|
|- align=center
|style="background:#ddd;"|NC
|35-3
|align=left| Jean Pascal
|
|
|
|align=left|
|align=left|
|- align=center
|Loss
|35-3
|align=left| Juergen Braehmer
|
|
|
|align=left|
|align=left|
|- align=center
|Win
|35-2
|align=left| José Alberto Clavero
|
|
|
|align=left|
|align=left|
|- align=center
|Win
|34-2
|align=left| Manuel Banquez
|
|
|
|align=left|
|align=left|
|- align=center
|Win
|33-2
|align=left| Rodrigo Chavez
|
|
|
|align=left|
|align=left|
|- align=center
|Win
|32-2
|align=left| Jorge Rodriguez Olivera
|
|
|
|align=left|
|align=left|
|- align=center
|Win
|31-2
|align=left| Franco Raul Sanchez
|
|
|
|align=left|
|align=left|
|- align=center
|Loss
|30-2
|align=left| Tony Bellew
|
|
|
|align=left| 
|align=left|
|- align=center
|Win
|30-1
|align=left| José Alberto Clavero
|
|
|
|align=left|
|align=left|
|- align=center
|Win
|29-1
|align=left| Evert Bravo
|
|
|
|align=left|
|align=left|
|- align=center
|Win
|28-1
|align=left| Jose Emilio Mazurier
|
|
|
|align=left|
|align=left|
|- align=center
|Win
|27-1
|align=left| Jose Hilton Dos Santos
|
|
|
|align=left|
|align=left|
|- align=center
|Win
|26-1
|align=left| Jose Emilio Mazurier
|
|
|
|align=left|
|align=left|
|- align=center
|Win
|25-1
|align=left| Martin David Islas
|
|
|
|align=left|
|align=left|
|- align=center
|Win
|24-1
|align=left| Martin David Islas
|
|
|
|align=left|
|align=left|
|- align=center
|Win
|23-1
|align=left| Martin David Islas
|
|
|
|align=left|
|align=left|
|- align=center
|Win
|22-1
|align=left| Pablo Daniel Zamora Nievas
|
|
|
|align=left|
|align=left|
|- align=center

References

External links

1984 births
Living people
Argentine male boxers
Light-heavyweight boxers